Alexander King (1899–1965), born Alexander King in Vienna, was a bestselling humorist, memoirist and media personality of the early television era, based in the United States.

In his late fifties, after becoming a frequent guest on the Tonight Show hosted by Jack Paar, King emerged as an incongruous presence in the realm of national celebrity: an aging, irascible raconteur, with elegant mannerisms and trademark bow tie, who spoke frankly and disarmingly about his bohemian lifestyle, multiple marriages, and years-long struggle with drug addiction. His checkered past led Time magazine to describe him as:
an ex-illustrator, ex-cartoonist, ex-adman, ex-editor, ex-playwright, ex-dope addict. For a quarter-century he was an ex-painter, and by his own bizarre account qualifies as an ex-midwife. He is also an ex-husband to three wives and an ex-Viennese of sufficient age (60) to remember muttonchopped Emperor Franz Joseph. When doctors told him a few years ago that he might soon be an ex-patient (two strokes, serious kidney disease, peptic ulcer, high blood pressure), he sat down to tell gay stories of the life of all these earlier Kings.

He was also the author of several books, including May This House Be Safe from Tigers, Mine Enemy Grows Older, (an account of his addiction to morphine, and his recovery), I Should Have Kissed Her More, and Is There Life After Birth. He illustrated and/or translated numerous editions of classics in the early 20th century as well as a book by Peter Altenberg released as Alexander King Presents Peter Altenberg's, Evocations of Love (a collection of sweet memories of the heart from another place and time in history). King's easy conversational recollections of the first part of the 20th century are informative and often funny.

External links
Alexander King A register of his papers in the Library of Congress
May This House Be Safe from Tigers review from Time magazine

Alexander King on the Jack Paar Tonight Show – YouTube

20th-century American memoirists
1899 births
1965 deaths
Austrian emigrants to the United States